Phyllanthus myrtifolius, known as mousetail plant or myrtle-leaf leaf-flower, is a shrub belonging to the genus Phyllanthus of the family Phyllanthaceae endemic to island of Sri Lanka.

Leaves
Numerous in 2-3's on suppressed branchlets, lanceolate-linear.

Trunk
Stems numerous, irregular; branchlets resemble pinnate leaves; B- vertically fissured; young parts finely pubescent.

Flowers
Inflorescence - several together in lax clusters.

Fruits
Purplish red to greenish, small, depressed, slightly 3-lobed, capsule.

Ecology
Along water courses in forest; gardens.

Uses
Hedges; ornamental.

Culture
Known as ගඟ වැ‍රැල්ල (ganga werella) in Sinhala.

References

 http://www.flowersofindia.net/catalog/slides/Mousetail%20Plant.html

External links
 http://www.bonsaihunk.us/Phyllanthus.html
 http://davesgarden.com/guides/pf/go/186360/
 http://pubs.acs.org/doi/abs/10.1021/np50116a013?journalCode=jnprdf
 http://www.hkflora.com/v2/leaf/euphor_show_plant.php?plantid=1095

myrtifolius
Endemic flora of Sri Lanka